
Gmina Pozezdrze is a rural gmina (administrative district) in Węgorzewo County, Warmian-Masurian Voivodeship, in northern Poland.

As of 2006 its total population is 3,498.

Villages
Gmina Pozezdrze contains the villages and settlements of Dziaduszyn, Gębałka, Harsz, Jakunówko, Kolonia Pozezdrze, Krzywińskie, Kuty, Nowy Harsz, Okowizna, Pieczarki, Piłaki Wielkie, Pozezdrze, Przerwanki, Przytuły, Radziszewo, Sapieniec, Stręgielek and Wyłudy.

Neighbouring gminas
Gmina Pozezdrze is bordered by the gminas of Banie Mazurskie, Budry, Giżycko, Kruklanki and Węgorzewo.

References
Polish official population figures 2006

Pozezdrze
Węgorzewo County